Zadrozny or Zadrożny (feminine: Zadrożna, plural Zadrożni) is a Polish-language surname. The ż is pronounced like the g in mirage. It is a geographic surname, meaning "beyond the way."

The name is most commonly found in Poland, the United States and Brazil. According to the website moikrewni.pl, there are 1,894 people in Poland with the surname Zadrozny. The highest concentrations live in Warsaw (235) and the areas to the northwest and west of the capital in Ostrów Mazowiecka (119), Garwolin (118) and Przasnysz (63).

History
An early reference to the name Zadrozny is the birth of Jakub Zadrozny in 1788 in Laskowizna, Mazowieckie, Poland, son of Pawel Zadrozny and Ewa Pomichterow.

One of the earliest records of the name Zadrozny in America is the Ellis Island arrival documentation of Jan Zadrozny who arrived aboard the S.S. Aachen in 1896.

People
 Alicia Zadrozny, American author and journalist
 Andy Zadrozny, American musician
Brandy Zadrozny, investigative journalist
 Carlos Curt Zadrozny (1926–1990) mayor of Blumenau, Brazil
 Catherine Zadrożny (born 1960), Polish actress
 Fabio Zadrozny, Brazilian author and computer scientist
 Jason Zadrozny (born 1980), British politician
 Jeanie Zadrozny, Miss Pennsylvania 1972
 Johannes Zadrozny, American actor
 Joseph Zadrozny, American diplomat
 Mitchell G. Zadrozny, American politician and sociologist.
 Peter Zadrozny, American author and computer scientist
 Tadeusz Zadrozny (born 1939), Polish cyclist
 Wlodek Zadrozny, Polish-American computer scientist and professor

Businesses
Zadrozny Fuel: family owned business in Huntington, NY, established in 1930.
Z's Orchard, Palisade, Colorado.

See also

Surnames
One Name Study

References

Surnames
Polish-language surnames